The 2018 Coupe du Président de la République is the 41st edition of the Coupe du Président de la République, the knockout football competition of Mauritania.

Preliminary round 1

Preliminary round 2

Widad Arafat		    bye

Round 1
First level teams enter in round 1.

Bye:
FC Jedida (Aleg)
Fondation SNIM
Widad Arafat
ASC Kédia
ASC SNIM
Kaédi FC
FC Teïssir
ASC Tidjikja
AS Garde
FC Deuz
Nouakchott Kings
ASC Police
ACS Ksar
ASAC Concorde

Round of 16

Quarterfinals

Semifinals

Final

See also
2017–18 Ligue 1 Mauritania

References

Mauritania
Cup
Football competitions in Mauritania